Lozotaenia basilea is a species of moth of the family Tortricidae. It is found on Bioko, an offshore island of Equatorial Guinea.

References

	

Moths described in 2008
Archipini